Andrés Fernández may refer to:

 Andrés Fernandez de Ipenza (died 1643), Spanish Roman Catholic prelate
 Andrés Fernández Pacheco, 10th Duke of Escalona (1710–1746), Spanish aristocrat and academic
 Andrés Fernández (footballer, born August 1986), Uruguayan football defender
 Andrés Fernández (footballer, born December 1986), Spanish football goalkeeper

See also
 Andre Fernandez (born 1968), American president of CBS Radio